Liber daticus vetustior (Lund, UB Mh 7) is a 12th-century illuminated manuscript probably made in Lund (then part of Denmark, today in Sweden). It was made to serve as the martyrology and obituary of the canons of Lund Cathedral.

History
The book was written sometime between 1139 and 1146, and was designed as a combined martyrology and book of obituaries over deceased canons from Lund Cathedral. It is likely that it was made to be ready at the time of the consecration of the chancel of the cathedral in 1145. The book belonged to the cathedral until the early 15th century, but its whereabouts after that until 1709 are not known in any detail. From 1709 it has been in the collections of the library of Lund University. It has been known by its Latin title Liber daticus vetustior since the 18th century, when it was first called so by Danish historian Jakob Langebek.

Description
The martyrology is modeled after the Martyrology of Ado, composed in the 9th century, and updated with more recent saints such as Saint Olaf and Saint Rimbert. The list of saints also includes several bishops from Metz Cathedral in Lorraine, which has led researchers to assume that the text is a copy from a book from Metz.

In addition, the book contains a calendar with the names of canons from the cathedral who died on the respective dates. A large number of these names have been copied from a somewhat earlier book from the cathedral, Necrologium Lundense, and new entries were made until  1410.

The text is decorated with twelve double initials (KL), one of which is much larger than the others. The initials were made at the same time as the oldest part of the text, in the 12th century. There are also 25 later decorative initials, made in the 13th century, as well as a few other decorative elements. The book is worn, showing traces of considerable use.

References

Works cited

External links
Digitilisation of the complete book, with annotations

12th-century illuminated manuscripts
Lund University
Swedish books
Christian illuminated manuscripts